Acyl-homoserine-lactone acylase (acyl-homoserine lactone acylase, AHL-acylase, AiiD, N-acyl-homoserine lactone acylase, PA2385 protein, quorum-quenching AHL acylase, quorum-quenching enzyme, PvdQ, QuiP) is an enzyme with systematic name N-acyl-L-homoserine-lactone amidohydrolase. This enzyme functions as a quorum quencher by catalysing the following chemical reaction

 an N-acyl-L-homoserine lactone + H2O  L-homoserine lactone + a carboxylate

Acyl homoserine lactones (AHLs) are produced by a number of bacterial species .

References

External links 
 

EC 3.5.1